Okobo is a Lower Cross River language of Nigeria.

References

Lower Cross River languages
Languages of Nigeria
Oron languages